The Vishera (also Вышера - Vyshera}) is a river in the Komi Republic in Russia, a right tributary of the Vychegda. The Vishera River freezes up in November and stays under the ice until April.

References

Rivers of the Komi Republic